Events in the year 1863 in Mexico.

Incumbents
President: Benito Juárez

Governors
 Aguascalientes: José Ma. Chávez Alonso
 Campeche: Pablo García Montilla
 Chiapas: Juan Clímaco Corzo/José Gabriel Esquinca
 Chihuahua: 
 Coahuila: 
 Colima: Ramón R. De la Vega
 Durango:  
 Guanajuato: 
 Guerrero: 
 Jalisco: 
 State of Mexico:  
 Michoacán: 
 Nuevo León: Santiago Vidaurri
 Oaxaca: 
 Puebla: 
 Querétaro: José María Arteaga
 San Luis Potosí: 
 Sinaloa: 
 Sonora: 
 Tabasco: 
 Tamaulipas:	 
 Veracruz: Ignacio de la Llave y Segura Zevallos
 Yucatán: 
 Zacatecas:

Events
January 10–12 – 1st Battle of Acapulco
March 16-May 17 – Siege of Puebla (1863)
April 30 – Battle of Camarón
May 5 – Battle of San Pablo del Monte

Births
June 16 – Francisco León de la Barra

Deaths
April 30 – Jean Danjou, French captain (born 1828 in France)
November 13 – Ignacio Comonfort, President of Mexico 1855-1857 (b. 1812)

References

 
Years of the 19th century in Mexico